Pointed hats have been a distinctive item of headgear of a wide range of cultures throughout history. Although often suggesting an ancient Indo-European tradition, they were also traditionally worn by women of Lapland, the Japanese, the Mi'kmaq people of Atlantic Canada, and the Huastecs of Veracruz and Aztec (e.g., as illustrated in the Codex Mendoza). The Kabiri of New Guinea have the diba, a pointed hat glued together.

History 
The conical hat is known to have existed as early as the Bronze Age in the Middle East, Eurasia, and Central Europe. Conical hats were recorded in ancient Egypt, especially when depicting Osiris and pharaohs, who emulated Osiris' iconography. Conical hats were also recorded by many Indo-European civilizations. Golden hats have been recorded in burial sites in Central Europe. The Scythians of the Eurasian steppes were noted for having pointed hats, often mentioned by other civilizations, such as in the DNa inscription on the tomb of Darius the Great. In Ancient Greece, the pilos was a common hat worn by travelers and infantrymen by the 5th century BCE. Popular among Burgundian noblewomen in the 15th century was a type of conical headgear now called a hennin. Conical hats were also popular in late medieval Vijayanagar, India.

Bronze Age 
The conical golden hats of Bronze Age Central Europe were probably a ceremonial accessory worn by the priesthood. The "Golden Man" of Issyk kurgan was Scythian in the 4th century who was buried wearing golden armor including a conical scythian hat.

Iron Age 
Textile analysis of the Tarim Mummies has shown some similarities to the Iron Age civilizations of Europe dating from 800 BCE, including woven twill and tartan patterns strikingly similar to tartans from Northern Europe. One unusual find was a distinctively pointed hat:

Pointed hats were also worn in ancient times by Saka (Scythians), and are shown on Hindu temples (as helmets and metal crowns) and in Hittite reliefs. As described by Herodotus, the name of the Scythian tribe of the tigrakhauda (Orthocorybantians) is a bahuvrihi compound literally translating to "people with pointed hats".

Besides the Scythians, the Cabeiri as well as Odysseus are traditionally pictured wearing a Pilos, or woolen conical hat.

Middle Ages 

The 13th-century Cumans commonly wore scythian style pointed hats, and are reported to have fought wearing them.

Originating from the Japanese Heian period, the kazaori eboshi (風折烏帽子) was worn by aristocrats to indicate rank. Still worn today for ceremonial purposes, this black linen hat was used during a samurai's ceremony in attaining manhood.

The Papal tiara in the Middle Ages is sometimes shown as more pointed than in more recent centuries, though also shown with no point. Mitra papalis is a type of conch named after the papal mitre for its form.

Medieval Jewish men wore distinctive headgear as required by European Christian authorities. This included the pointed Jewish hat (or "Judenhut") already worn by Jews, a piece of clothing probably imported from the Islamic world and perhaps before that from Persia.

Popular among Burgundian noblewomen in the 15th century was a type of conical headgear now called a hennin.

From the 13th to the 15th centuries, the liripipe hood was commonplace, where the rear of the hood was considerably extended (to a meter or more) in a conical form, which was variously worn as a scarf, or allowed to hang behind, in the form now commonly found now in academic robes.

Modern times 

The Spitzhut is a traditional kind of headgear in Bavaria.

Pointed hoods were used by various orders and Catholic lay confraternities for processions (e.g., the Semana Santa of Sevilla, who wore the Capirote).

Pointed hats are still worn in the rural Louisiana Mardi Gras celebrations by the Cajuns, the Courir de Mardi Gras, where they are known as capuchons.

The Ku Klux Klan has worn this headgear since its inception.

Tall conical hats are common to traditional folk ceremonies in many parts of Europe, particularly at Carnival time. Examples can still be seen in Italy, Spain, and Bulgaria.

The May Day hobby horses of Padstow and Minehead in southwest England have pointed hats with masks attached.

Types

See also 
 List of hats and headgear
 Headgear
 Mitre
 Gugel
 Cap

References

Bibliography 
 Barber, A.W. (1999). The Mummies of Ürümchi. Macmillan, London.

External links 
 Other groups from the Middle ages who wore tall pointed hats!

 
Hats